Rafael Augusto Buzacarini (born 6 October 1991) is a heavyweight judoka from Brazil. He won a bronze medal at the 2014 Pan American Championships and qualified for the 2016 Olympics.

He represented Brazil at the 2020 Summer Olympics.

References

External links
 

1991 births
Living people
Olympic judoka of Brazil
Judoka at the 2016 Summer Olympics
Brazilian male judoka
Universiade medalists in judo
Universiade bronze medalists for Brazil
Medalists at the 2013 Summer Universiade
Judoka at the 2020 Summer Olympics
21st-century Brazilian people
People from Barra Bonita, São Paulo